All Men Are Brothers: Blood of the Leopard is a 1993 Hong Kong wuxia film directed by Billy Chan and starring Tony Leung, Joey Wong, Elvis Tsui and Sean Lau. The film is adapted from Shi Nai'an's 14th-century novel Water Margin, which is considered one of the Four Great Classical Novels of Chinese literature.

Plot
Lam Chung (Tony Leung), the coach of eight hundred thousand Royal Guards, is a righteous person that is highly regarded by the imperial court and is addressed as a "martial arts mania". One day, Lam meets "Flowery Monk" Lo Chi-sam at Mount Wutai and with their wise appreciation of each other, they become sworn brothers. In order to help his brother to avoid frustration, Lo advises Lam to go to Liangshan County with him, but Lam rejects due to his loyalty.

Lam meets Sau Ng (Sean Lau) and became good friends with him. Ko Nga-noi (Pal Sinn), the godson of evil official Ko Chau (Lau Shun) is coveted by the beauty of Lam's wife (Joey Wong). His underling Luk Him (Lam Wai) is bent on taking the title of the coach of the  eight hundred thousand Royal Guards. Lam is later framed by Ko Chau and was sentenced to be escorted to Changzhou Road. In the meantime, Lam's wife, who was trying to protect her chastity, was accidentally killed by Ko Nga-noi. Sau, who is mortally wounded, informs Lam and at this time, Lo joins forces with his brother Lam to battle the army soldiers. Finally, Lam kills Luk Him and avenges his beloved wife and his friend Sau. While on despair, Lam goes to Liangshan with Lo and they become Water Margin Heroes.

Cast

 Note: Some of the characters' names are in Cantonese romanisation.
Tony Leung Ka-fai as Lam Chung
Joey Wong as Lam Chung's wife
Elvis Tsui as Lo Chi-sam
Sean Lau as Sau Ng
Lam Wai as Luk Him
Lau Shun as Ko Chau
Pal Sinn as Ko Nga-noi
Austin Wai as Flying Tiger (cameo)
Wu Ma as Prime Minister
Billy Ching
Tai Po as Ko Nga-noi's henchmen
Chow Chi-fai

Box office
The film grossed HK$6,595,025 at the Hong Kong box office during its theatrical run from 2 to 15 April 1993 in Hong Kong.

Award nomination
13th Hong Kong Film Awards
Nominated: Best Supporting Actor (Elvis Tsui)

External links

All Men Are Brothers: Blood of the Leopard at Hong Kong Cinemagic

All Men Are Brothers: Blood of the Leopard film review at LoveHKFilm.com

1990s action comedy-drama films
1993 martial arts films
1993 films
1990s Cantonese-language films
Hong Kong action comedy-drama films
Hong Kong martial arts films
Kung fu films
Hong Kong slapstick comedy films
Films based on Water Margin
Wuxia films
1993 comedy films
1993 drama films
1990s Hong Kong films